Philomène Omatuku Atshakawo Akatshi is a politician from the Democratic Republic of the Congo.

Career 
She served as Minister for Women's Affairs in 2007 under President Joseph Kabila and Prime Minister Antoine Gizenga. In Gizenga's second cabinet she held the post of "Ministre de Genre, de la Famille et de l'Enfant": Minister for Gender, the Family and the Child.

See also 

 Christophe Mboso N'Kodia Pwanga
 Jeannine Mabunda
 Gabriel Kyungu wa Kumwanza

References

Year of birth missing (living people)
Living people
Women government ministers of the Democratic Republic of the Congo
Ministers for Women's Affairs of the Democratic Republic of the Congo
21st-century Democratic Republic of the Congo women politicians
21st-century Democratic Republic of the Congo politicians